Wang Ping, also Wang Pin, Wong Ping (1 October 1953-) is a retired Taiwanese film actress, working in the Cinema of Hong Kong. She starred in about 35 Hong Kong kung-fu movies, many under Shaw Brothers studios, in the 1970s, including The Chinese Boxer (1970), King Boxer (1972) and The Black Enforcer (1972). She appeared in the Shaw films . She did make one last appearance with a very minor role in Island of Greed (1997).

References

External links 
 
 

Taiwanese film actresses
Hong Kong film actresses
1953 births
Living people
Actresses from Kaohsiung
Taiwanese-born Hong Kong artists